Alfred M. G. Smairl (born 16 January 1907) was a rugby union player who represented Australia.

Smairl, a wing, was born in Paddington, New South Wales, and earned three international rugby caps for Australia.

References

Australian rugby union players
Australia international rugby union players
1907 births
Year of death missing
Rugby union players from Sydney
Rugby union wings